Health Psychology Review is a quarterly peer-reviewed medical review journal covering health psychology. It was established in 2007 and is published by Taylor & Francis on behalf of the European Health Psychology Society, of which it is the official journal. The editor-in-chief is Martin Hagger (Curtin University and University of Jyväskylä). According to the Journal Citation Reports, the journal has a 2016 impact factor of 7.241.

References

External links

Health psychology journals
Review journals
Publications established in 2007
Quarterly journals
Taylor & Francis academic journals
Academic journals associated with international learned and professional societies of Europe
English-language journals